Pseudopalaemon bouvieri is a species of shrimp of the family Palaemonidae. The broad-snouted caiman frequently preys upon Pseudopalaemon bouvieri. Pseudopalaemon bouvieri is omnivorous.

References

Crustaceans described in 1911
Fauna of Argentina
Fauna of Uruguay
Palaemonidae